Daniel Vacek (born 1 April 1971) is a former tennis player from Czechoslovakia and the Czech Republic who turned professional in 1990. He reached the quarterfinals of the 1995 Paris Masters, the 1998 Canada Masters and the 1998 Cincinnati Masters, and achieved a career-high singles ranking of world No. 26 in January 1996.

Vacek represented his native country at the 1996 Summer Olympics in Atlanta where he was defeated in the second round. The right-hander won 25 career titles in doubles with various partners, including the French Open in 1996 and 1997, and the US Open in 1997 with Yevgeny Kafelnikov.

ATP career finals

Doubles (25 titles, 15 runner-ups)

Doubles performance timeline

External links
 
 
 

1971 births
Living people
Czech male tennis players
Czechoslovak male tennis players
French Open champions
Olympic tennis players of the Czech Republic
Tennis players from Prague
Tennis players at the 1996 Summer Olympics
US Open (tennis) champions
Grand Slam (tennis) champions in men's doubles